Mizanur Rahman Khan Dipu was a Bangladesh Awami League politician and the former Member of Parliament.

Early life
Dipu was born on 6 November 1964 in Kulutola, Old Dhaka, East Pakistan.

Career
Dipu was elected to parliament in 2008 from Dhaka-6 as a candidate of Bangladesh Awami League in the 10th General Election of Bangladesh. He defeated the Bangladesh Nationalist Party candidate Sadeque Hossain Khoka in the election.

Death
Dipu died on 21 December 2013 in Apollo Hospital Dhaka, Bangladesh.

References

Awami League politicians
Living people
1964 births
9th Jatiya Sangsad members